The Tokomairaro River is located in Otago, New Zealand. It flows southeast for some 50 kilometres (30 mi), reaching the Pacific Ocean at Toko Mouth 50 kilometres (30 mi) south of Dunedin. The town of Milton is located on the Tokomairaro's floodplain, close to the junction of its two main branches (which run past the north and south ends of the town).

The name of the river is Māori, and translates roughly as 'place where canoe must be poled' (a possible reference to the method needed to travel through the extensive wetlands, instead of the usual paddling).  The Tokomairaro River is prone to seasonal flooding during the heavy rainfall months, August to October.  Local industrial buildings have been forced to build high concrete walls around their property to reduce flood damage each year.

The spelling of the river changed from "Tokomairiro River" to "Tokomairaro River" on 28 July 2016. Both spellings have been in use since mid-1800s, however "Tokomairaro" was deemed to be correct.

References

Rivers of Otago
Clutha District
Rivers of New Zealand
Milton, New Zealand